Spokane, Portland and Seattle Railway's Class L-2 was a class of 4-4-0 steam locomotives.

References 

L-2
4-4-0 locomotives
Steam locomotives of the United States
Standard gauge locomotives of the United States
Railway locomotives introduced in 1881